The White House in Christianburg, Kentucky, also known as Otto Minch House, is a Gothic Revival building from before 1882, perhaps much before.  It is of frame construction with brick nogging.  It was listed on the National Register of Historic Places in 1988.

It was deemed significant in part "because it is a unique example of board and batten Gothic Revival in Shelby County."  It is unusual also for its side passage plan architecture in a rural residence.

References

National Register of Historic Places in Shelby County, Kentucky
Houses on the National Register of Historic Places in Kentucky
Gothic Revival architecture in Kentucky
Houses in Shelby County, Kentucky
Side passage plan architecture in the United States
1882 establishments in Kentucky
Houses completed in 1882